Gunnison Valley High School (GVHS) is a public high school located in Gunnison, Sanpete County, Utah, United States. Part of the South Sanpete School District, it was built to serve students in the cities of Gunnison, Centerfield, Fayette, Mayfield, and Axtell. Its mascot is the Bulldog. The official school colors are blue and white. , its principal is Eugene King.

References

External links

 

Public high schools in Utah
Schools in Sanpete County, Utah